Antonis Kafetzopoulos (born 13 October 1951) is a Greek actor. He appeared in more than fifty films since 1980. He has won two Hellenic Film Academy Awards for his roles in the films Plato's Academy and Unfair World. He also won the best actor award in San Sebastián International Film Festival for his role in Unfair World He became popular to wider audience from the successful television series Kai oi Pantremenoi Ehoun Psyhi, aired in period 1997–2000.

Education
In 1969 he entered the financial and political department of the law school of the university of Thessaloniki but abandoned his studies in 1971.

Selected filmography

References

External links 

1951 births
Living people
Greek male film actors
Constantinopolitan Greeks
Male actors from Istanbul
Male actors from Athens